Ira Flatow (born March 9, 1949) is a radio and television journalist and author who hosts Public Radio International's popular program Science Friday. On TV, he hosted the Emmy Award-winning PBS series Newton's Apple, a television science program for children and their families. Later he hosted another PBS series, Big Ideas. He has published several books, the most recent titled Present at the Future: From Evolution to Nanotechnology, Candid and Controversial Conversations on Science and Nature.

Personal life
Flatow is a native of New York and currently lives in Connecticut. He has been married to realtor Miriam Flatow (née Wagenberg) since 1983 and has three children.

Education 
Flatow graduated from State University of New York at Buffalo with a BS in Engineering in 1971.

Career
In 1966, Flatow began his career in broadcasting working in television at KHD-21 TV at H. Frank Carey High School in Franklin Square, New York.  In 1969, Flatow began working in radio at WBFO, in Buffalo, New York, first as a reporter covering Vietnam anti-war demonstrations and riots and then as news director, 1971.  During this time, he was working on an engineering degree at the State University of New York at Buffalo. Flatow's first science stories were created in 1970 during the first Earth Day.

National Public Radio
From 1971 to 1986, he was on staff at NPR serving as a production assistant, associate producer, producer and science correspondent and reported on topics including the Kennedy Space Center, Three Mile Island, HIV/AIDS and the South Pole. From 1991 to 2013 he hosted Science Friday for NPR, which he anchored each Friday afternoon, discussing topics in science and technology.

PRI, Public Radio International
On January 1, 2014, the Science Friday program moved from NPR to PRI (Public Radio International) with Flatow continuing as host.

WNYC Studios
On April 11, 2018, distribution of Science Friday changed hands once more when it went from PRI to WNYC Studios.

Television
From 1982 through 1987 he hosted the Emmy Award-winning PBS science program Newton's Apple, which originated at KTCA in St. Paul, Minnesota. In 1991, Flatow wrote and reported science and technology for CBS News' CBS This Morning. He has discussed cutting-edge science on a number of programs, including the Cablevision program Maximum Science. He hosted the PBS series Big Ideas produced by WNET. His TV credits include science reporter for CBS This Morning, Westinghouse, and cable's CNBC. Flatow wrote, produced and hosted an hour-long documentary about the history of the transistor called Transistorized!, which aired on PBS.  He has talked about science on a number TV shows including The Merv Griffin Show, Today, Charlie Rose, and The Oprah Winfrey Show. He has written three books that popularize topics in science and technology: Rainbows, Curveballs, and Other Wonders of the Natural World Explained, They All Laughed... From Light Bulbs to Lasers: The Fascinating Stories Behind the Great Inventions That Have Changed Our Lives, and Present at the Future: From Evolution to Nanotechnology, Candid and Controversial Conversations on Science and Nature.

Flatow is founder and president of the Science Friday Initiative (previously TalkingScience) a non-profit company dedicated to creating radio, TV, and Internet projects aimed at making science user friendly.

In 2009, Flatow had a voice cameo appearance as himself on the CBS sitcom The Big Bang Theory in "The Vengeance Formulation" (season 3, episode 9). In the episode, Flatow interviews Dr. Sheldon Cooper (Jim Parsons) on his research on magnetic monopoles. Flatow was given a co-star credit.

In 2013, Flatow appears as himself in person for another guest-star appearance on The Big Bang Theory, interviewing Dr. Sheldon Cooper and Dr. Leonard Hofstadter on Science Friday about Cooper's failed discovery in "The Discovery Dissipation" (season 7, episode 10).

In 2017, Flatow once again appeared on The Big Bang Theory interviewing Leonard Hofstadter for "Science Friday" (Season 11, Episode 2).

In 2014, Flatow settled a dispute with the federal government over a federal grant from the National Science Foundation. Flatow did not admit any wrongdoing and he and his company settled with the government for a fee of about $146,000. Flatow and ScienceFriday, Inc., were barred from future federal grants for one year, ending in 2015.

Honors and awards

Doctor of Humanities, SUNY Buffalo (honorary 2014)
Distinguished Visiting Fellow, University of California, Santa Barbara (2014)
Doctor of Science Education, Muhlenberg College (honorary 2013)
American Humanist Association's Isaac Asimov Science Award (2012)
Nierenberg Prize for Science in the Public Interest (2010)
Member Connecticut Academy of Science and Engineering
American Institute of Biological Sciences President's Citation Award (2008)
National Science Teachers Association Faraday Science Communicator Award (2007)
Alan Houghton Award, Harlem Children Society (2006)
National Science Board, Public Service Award (2005)
National Technology Leadership Excellence Award (2003)
E.A. Wood Science Writing Award (2002)
AAAS-Science Journalism Award - Television (2000)
Carl Sagan Award for Public Appreciation of Science, Council of Scientific Society Presidents (1999)
Women in Communications Matrix Award (1992)
AAAS-Westinghouse Science Journalism Award - Radio (1983)
AAAS-Westinghouse Science Journalism Award - Television (1983)
National Association of Science Writers Science In Society Journalism Award (1981)
Ohio State Award (1981)
Bronze Cindy Award, Information Film Producers of America (1980)
American Psychological Foundation National Media Award (1977)

References

Bibliography

External links

Ira Flatow official website
Science Friday official website
Science Friday Initiative web site

Interview with Ira Flatow, A DISCUSSION WITH National Authors on Tour TV Series, Episode #22 (1992)

1949 births
American radio journalists
American television journalists
Living people
NPR personalities
University at Buffalo alumni
American male journalists
American online journalists
Journalists from New York City